Johannes Wübbe (born 23 February 1966 in Lengerich) has been the Titular Bishop of Ros Cré (and auxiliary bishop of Osnabrück) since 18 June 2013. 
In 1970, the Roman Catholic Church revived the title.

References

Living people
1966 births
21st-century Roman Catholic titular bishops
21st-century German Roman Catholic bishops